The pillory is a device made of a wooden or metal framework erected on a post, with holes for securing the head and hands, formerly used for punishment by public humiliation and often further physical abuse. The pillory is related to the stocks.

Etymology 
The word is documented in English since 1274 (attested in Anglo-Latin from ), and stems from Old French  (1168; modern French , see below), itself from medieval Latin , of uncertain origin, perhaps a diminutive of Latin  'pillar, stone barrier'.

Description

Rather like the lesser punishment called the stocks, the pillory consisted of hinged wooden boards forming holes through which the head and/or various limbs were inserted; then the boards were locked together to secure the captive. Pillories were set up to hold people in marketplaces, crossroads, and other public places. They were often placed on platforms to increase public visibility of the person. Often a placard detailing the crime was placed nearby; these punishments generally lasted only a few hours.

In being forced to bend forward and stick their head and hands out in front of them, offenders in the pillory would have been extremely uncomfortable during their punishment. However, the main purpose in putting criminals in the pillory was to humiliate them publicly. On discovering that the pillory was occupied, people would excitedly gather in the marketplace to taunt, tease and laugh at the offender on display.

Those who gathered to watch the punishment typically wanted to make the offender's experience as unpleasant as possible.  In addition to being jeered and mocked, those in the pillory might be pelted with rotten food, mud, offal, dead animals, and animal excrement. Sometimes people were killed or maimed in the pillory because crowds could get too violent and pelt the offender with stones, bricks and other dangerous objects.  However, when Daniel Defoe was sentenced to the pillory in 1703 for seditious libel, he was regarded as a hero by the crowd and was pelted with flowers.

The criminal could also be sentenced to further punishments while in the pillory: humiliation by shaving off some or all hair or regular corporal punishment(s), notably flagellation (the pillory serving as the "whipping post") or even permanent mutilation such as branding or having an ear cut off (cropping), as in the case of John Bastwick.

In Protestant cultures (such as in the Scandinavian countries), the pillory would be the worldly part of a church punishment. The delinquent would therefore first serve the ecclesiastical part of his punishment on the pillory bench in the church itself, and then be handed to the worldly authorities to be bound to the Skampåle (literally: "Shame Pole") for public humiliation.

Uses

In 1816, use of the pillory was restricted in England to punishment for perjury or subornation. The pillory was formally abolished as a form of punishment in England and Wales in 1837, after Lord John Russell had said "I shall likewise propose to bring in a Bill to abolish the punishment of the pillory—a punishment which is never inflicted." However, the stocks remained in use, though extremely infrequently, until 1872. The last person to be pilloried in England was Peter James Bossy, who was convicted of "wilful and corrupt perjury" in 1830. He was convicted of seven years penal transportation, six months in prison at Newgate and one hour in the pillory in the Old Bailey.

In France, time in the "" was usually limited to two hours. It was replaced in 1789 by "exposition", and abolished in 1832. Two types of devices were used:

 The  (literally: "post" or "pole") was a simple post, often with a board around only the neck, and was synonymous with the mode of punishment. The , an iron ring around the neck to tie a prisoner to such a post, was the name of a similar punishment that was abolished in 1832.
 A permanent small tower, the upper floor of which had a ring made of wood or iron with holes for the victim's head and arms, which was often on a turntable to expose the condemned to all parts of the crowd.

Like other permanent apparatus for physical punishment, the pillory was often placed prominently and constructed more elaborately than necessary. It served as a symbol of the power of the judicial authorities, and its continual presence was seen as a deterrent, like permanent gallows for authorities endowed with high justice.

In Portugal, it is called , and there are monuments of great importance because they are known since the Roman times. Usually, they are located on the main square of the town, and/or in front of a major church or a palace.  They are made of stone with a column and the top carved.  are considered major local monuments, several clearly bearing the coat of arms of a king or queen. The same is true of its former colonies, notably in Brazil (in its former capital, Salvador, the whole old quarter is known as ) and Africa (e.g. Cape Verde's old capital, Cidade Velha), always as symbols of royal power. In Spain, the device was called .

The pillory was also in common use in other western countries and colonies, and similar devices were used in other, non-Western cultures. According to one source, the pillory was abolished as a form of punishment in the United States in 1839, but this cannot be entirely true because it was clearly in use in Delaware as recently as 1901. Governor Preston Lea finally signed a bill to abolish the pillory in Delaware in March 1905.

Punishment by whipping-post remained on the books in Delaware until 1972, when it became the last state to abolish it.  Delaware was the last state to sentence someone to whipping in 1963; however, the sentence was commuted.  The last whipping in Delaware was in 1952.

Similar humiliation devices

There was a variant (rather of the stocks type), called a barrel pillory, or Spanish mantle, used to punish drunks, which is reported in England and among its troops. It fitted over the entire body, with the head sticking out from a hole in the top. The criminal is put in either an enclosed barrel, forcing him to kneel in his own filth, or an open barrel, also known as "barrel shirt" or "drunkards collar" after the punishable crime, leaving him to roam about town or military camp and be ridiculed and scorned.

Although a pillory, by its physical nature, could double as a whipping post to tie a criminal down for public flagellation (as used to be the case in many German sentences to staupenschlag), the two as such are separate punishments: the pillory is a sentence to public humiliation, whipping is an essentially painful corporal punishment. The combination of the pillory and the whipping post was one of the various punishments the Puritans of the Massachusetts Bay Colony applied to enforce religious and intellectual comformity on the whole community.  Sometimes a single structure was built with separate locations for the two punishments, with a whipping post on the lower level and a pillory above (see image at right).

When permanently present in sight of prisoners, whipping posts were thought to act as a deterrent against bad behaviour, especially when each prisoner had been subjected to a "welcome beating" on arrival, as in 18th-century Waldheim in Saxony (12, 18 or 24 whip lashes on the bare posterior tied to a pole in the castle courtyard, or by birch rod over the "bock", a bench in the corner). Still a different penal use of such constructions is to tie the criminal down, possibly after a beating, to expose him for a long time to the elements, usually without food and drink, even to the point of starvation.

Notable cases
 
Peter Annet
Thomas Cochrane, 10th Earl of Dundonald
Daniel Defoe
James Nayler
Elizabeth Needham
Titus Oates

Legacy

While the pillory has left common use, the image remains preserved in the figurative use, which has become the dominant one, of the verb "to pillory" (attested in English since 1699), meaning "to expose to public ridicule, scorn and abuse", or more generally to humiliate before witnesses.

See also
Cangue
Judicial corporal punishment
Jougs
Scold's bridle
Shrew's fiddle

Notes

References

Bibliography

External links

Examples of Pillories from the UK and Ireland on geograph.org.uk
Debate in the House of Commons on the Pillory Abolition Bill, 6 April 1815
Debate in the House of Lords on the Pillory Abolition Bill, 5 July 1815 and 10 July 1815
Debate in the House of Commons on the Pillory Abolition Bill, 22 February 1816
Debate in the House of Lords on the Pillory Abolition Bill, 26 February 1816

European instruments of torture
Medieval instruments of torture
Modern instruments of torture
Physical restraint
Punishment